The wild boar and boar's head are common charges in heraldry.

Early history
The boar was used as an emblem in some instances during antiquity and the Early Middle Ages (i.e. predating the development of classical European heraldry). During the Roman Empire, at least three legions are known to have had a boar as their emblems - Legio I Italica, Legio X Fretensis and Legio XX Valeria Victrix.
The Knocknagael Boar Stone is a well-known Pictish stone with a depiction of a boar emblem dating to ca. the 7th century. In this context, the name of Orkney is interpreted as being derived from orc-, the Celtic for "pig", presumably from a Pictish tribe which had the boar or wild pig as their emblem. The boar also appears as an emblem for Germanic peoples during the Anglo-Saxon,  Vendel and Viking periods. This is reflected in the boar helmets worn in battle, attested in archeological records and both Old English and Old Norse written sources. The boar is closely associated with Freyr and has also been proposed to be a totemic animal to the Swedes, in particular the Yngling royal dynasty who ruled at a cultic centre for the god.
 
The most familiar Ferguson Clan crest has the three boars on an Azure blue shield with a buckle in the center. Three royal Irish Ferguson brothers originally came to Scotland from Ireland and became the Kings of Dalriada - they battled and married into the Picts uniting Scotland and are considered to be the first kings of Scotland. The three brothers started separate Ferguson family clans in different areas of Scotland and have some difference in their crests but the most common is the three boars crest. This information and more can be found in the History of the Ferguson Clan. 

With the development of heraldry  in the Late Middle Ages,  the boar makes an appearance as the  White Boar, personal device of Richard III of England, used for large numbers of his livery badges.

In the 15th century, a coat of arms of "Tribalia", depicting a wild boar with an arrow pierced through the head (see Boars in heraldry), appeared in the supposed Coat of Arms of Emperor Stefan Dušan (r. 1331–1355). The motif had, in 1415, been used as the Coat of Arms of the Serbian Despotate and is recalled in one of Stefan Lazarević's personal Seals, according to the paper Сабор у Констанци. Pavao Ritter Vitezović also depicts "Triballia" with the same motif in 1701 and 
Hristofor Žefarović again in 1741. With the beginning of the First Serbian Uprising (1804-1813), the Parliament adopted the Coat of arms of Serbia in 1805. Their official seal depicted the heraldic emblems of Serbia and Tribalia.

The Buzic noble family of Bohemia used a boar's head as heraldic device from the 14th century, later (as Zajíc) combined with a hare.

Early modern and modern examples
In heraldry of the early modern period, use of a boar's head (rather than the entire animal) became a popular device.
Siebmachers Wappenbuch (1605) shows a boar in the coat of arms of the Schweinichen noble family.

Boars, in whole or in part, feature frequently in British heraldry. While a distinction is sometimes made between the wild animal, termed the wild boar or sanglier, and the male of the domestic pig, termed simply the boar, these are not depicted differently from one another in practice. The boar's head is a common charge, and in English heraldry is traditionally shown attached to its neck. In Scottish and Welsh heraldry, however, it terminated behind the ears. In the first case, the boar's head is described as being couped or erased at the neck, while in the latter it is couped or erased close.

Modern rulers who have used the boar's head as part of their coats of arms include Joseph Bonaparte and Joachim Murat.

Family coats of arms
In Ireland, boars feature in many coats of arms of the noble families. Three boars are seen on coats of arms of Lockhart, Grimsby, Healy, and James Edward Oglethorpe. In addition, the Sullivan-Mor coat of arms bears a boar, and the Sullivan-Ber crest has two. The O'Deorain (Doran) clan, being an offshoot of the Sullivans, has a boar upon its crest as well. The Rogan coat of arms features a boar crossing a hilltop. The Healy clan, has three boars' heads. The Purcell clan's coat of arms features four black boars' heads. The McCann coat of arms features a boar as well. The Crowley coat of arms features a blue boar surrounded by three red crosses. The Cassidy coat of arms features a white boar in a red triangular field under two red lions. . The  O’Hanlon family coat of arms features a boar and was used as the Standard Bearer for Orior (present day Ulster). Some Irish Keating families have been granted arms containing a boar going through a holly bush to symbolize toughness and courage.

In Scotland, a boar's head is the crest of Clan Campbell and Clan Innes. It appears in both the coat of arms and crest of Clan Chisholm.  Three boars' heads appear in the coats of arms of the related clans Swinton, Gordon, Nesbitt and Urquhart. Three boars' heads are also used by the unrelated Bannerman clan. 

In Spain, the coats of arms of the noble families Garmendia, Urraga, Urrutia, Urieta and Urmeneta have a boar.  Boars, wolves and bears are common charges in Basque armory, especially from Guipuzcoa.

Cities and Towns

Boar charges are also often used in canting (heraldic punning). The German towns of Eberbach  and Ebersbach an der Fils, both in Baden-Württemberg, and Ebersbach, Saxony use civic arms that demonstrates this. Each depicts a boar  -  in German (and in two cases a wavy fess or bars meant to represent a brook -  in German).

Albano Laziale in Italy is near the site where, according to legend, Aeneas's son Ascanius founded Alba Longa; the modern city's coat of arms today sports the white (Latin: Alba) boar dreamt by Ascanius before the founding of the city.
Malacky in Slovakia also has a coat of arms with a wild boar. The name of the city, which was first mentioned in writing in 1206, refers to the word "Malacka" which means "piglet" in the Hungarian (Magyar) language.

In Serbia, the municipalities and cities of Barajevo, Kragujevac, Lapovo, Lajkovac, Topola, Velika Plana, and Voždovac use the Triballian boar for their larger and/or smaller coat of arms, ether as part of the heraldic shield or as the Supporter animals on the larger coat of arms.

Military and paramilitary badges

In various armorials, the Serbian coat of arms has featured the pierced head of a wild boar, also known as the coat of arms of Triballia. The war flag of the Serbian revolutionary forces during the First Serbian Uprising featured it together with the Serbian cross. 
 
The Lorne Scots, a Canadian Army Infantry regiment use the Boar's Head as a symbol due to their affiliation with Clan Campbell.

In Belgium, the wild boar is the symbolic animal of the Ardennes forests in the south of the country, and is the mascot of one of the Belgian Army's premier infantry regiments, the Régiment de Chasseurs Ardennais, the soldiers of which wear a boar's head pin on their beret.

See also
Wild boar
White boar

References

 
Heraldic beasts
Mythological pigs